The Institute of General Semantics (IGS) is a not-for-profit corporation established in 1938 by Alfred Korzybski, to support research and publication on the topic of general semantics. The Institute publishes Korzybski's writings, including the seminal text Science & Sanity, and books by other authors who have studied or taught general semantics, such as Robert Pula, Irving J. Lee, Wendell Johnson, and Stuart Chase. Every year since 1952, it has sponsored the Alfred Korzybski Memorial Lecture, with presenters from a broad range of disciplines, from science to medicine to entertainment, including names like actor Steve Allen, psychologist Albert Ellis, scientist and visionary R. Buckminster Fuller, linguist Allen Walker Read, and philosopher F. S. C. Northrop. The Institute offers periodic seminars, workshops and conferences and is headquartered in New York City.

The IGS is closely affiliated with GS groups around the globe, including the Australian General Semantics Society.

The Institute of General Semantics publishes:

 ETC: A Review of General Semantics, a quarterly journal printed since 1943, distributed to IGS members and subscribed to by over 350 libraries around the world.
 Numerous books, CDs and DVDs on general semantics.

Alfred Korzybski Memorial Lecture
The Alfred Korzybski Memorial Lecture (AKML) series was begun in 1952. It is an annual event sponsored by the Institute of General Semantics in honor of Alfred Korzybski. Each year the Institute invites some prominent scholar or otherwise notable individual to give the lecture. Lecturers have included inventor R. Buckminster Fuller,  physicist James A. Van Allen, entertainer Steve Allen, Gregory Bateson, Neil Postman and Ashley Montagu. The only person to give the lecture more than once was surgeon Russell Meyers, in 1958 and 1985.

Lecturers
1952: William Vogt and Ashley Montagu
1953: F. J. Roethlisberger
1954: F. S. C. Northrop
1955: R. Buckminster Fuller
1956: Clyde Kluckhohn
1957: Abraham Maslow
1958: Russell Meyers
1959: Symposium with Charles M. Pomerat, William J. Fry, and James A. Van Allen
1960: Warren S. McCulloch
1961: Robert R. Blake
1962: Harold G. Cassidy
1963: Henri Laborit
1964: Joost A. M. Meerloo
1965: Henry Lee Smith Jr.
1966: Alvin M. Weinberg
1967: J. Bronowski
1968: Alastair M. Taylor
1969: Lancelot Law Whyte
1970: Gregory Bateson
1971: Henry Margenau
1972: George Steiner
1973: Panel with J. Samuel Bois, Elton S. Carter, and Walter Probert
1974: Kenneth G. Johnson and Neil Postman
1975: Harley C. Shands
1976: Roger W. Wescott
1977: Ben Bova
1978: Elwood Murray
1979: Don Fabun
1980: Barbara Morgan
1981: Thomas Sebeok
1982: Robert R. Blake and Jane Srygley Mouton
1983: Allen Walker Read
1984: Karl H. Pribram
1985: Russell Meyers
1986: George F. F. Lombard
1987: Richard W. Paul
1988: Jerome Bruner
1989: William V. Haney
1990: Warren M. Robbins
1991: Albert Ellis
1992: Steve Allen
1993: William Lutz
1994: Lotfi A. Zadeh
1995: Nicholas Johnson
1996: Mihaly Csikszentmihalyi
1997: Robert Anton Wilson
1998: Theodore R. Sizer
1999: Ellen J. Langer
2000: Robert P. Pula
2001: Lou Marinoff
2002: J. Allan Hobson
2003: Sanford I. Berman
2005: Robert L. Carneiro
2006: Renee Hobbs
2007: Leonard Shlain
2008: Douglas Rushkoff
2009: Mary Catherine Bateson
2010: Deborah Tannen
2011: Sherry Turkle
2012: Shawn Lawrence Otto
2013: Terrence W. Deacon
2014: Jack El-Hai
2015: Andrew Keen
2016: Iain McGilchrist
2017: Terry Moran
2018: Lance Strate
2019: Nadine Strossen
2020: Siva Vaidhyanathan (planned)

See also
 Alfred Korzybski
 General Semantics
 Marjorie Kendig
 Robert Pula
 Elwood Murray
 Sanford I. Berman

References

External links
 Australian General Semantics Society
 The Institute of General Semantics
Science & Sanity

General semantics
1938 establishments in the United States
Organizations established in 1938
501(c)(3) organizations
Non-profit organizations based in New York (state)